Geira (ca. 965 – 985) was a Wendish princess and the eldest daughter of Burislav.

About 978 she married an unknown prince. Her first husband died about 981.

In 982 she married Olaf I of Norway. They are said to have had no children.

References

Slavic mythology
Year of birth uncertain
960s births
985 deaths